The 2361 Class was a class of steam locomotives of the Great Western Railway. There were twenty 2361s, numbered 2361-2380 and built at Swindon Railway Works at Lot 67 in 1885/6. They were part of an unusual standardisation scheme whereby William Dean designed four double-framed classes with similar boilers but different wheel arrangements, the others being the 1661, 3201 and 3501.

Design
The 2361 Class is sometimes described, erroneously, as the "outside-framed version of the Dean Goods". While it is true that there is a superficial resemblance, above the running plate; that the 2361s likewise have  diameter wheels; and that they are numbered in the same sequence; they are nevertheless a quite separate class, having a longer cylinder stroke, larger boiler, longer wheelbase, and consequently greater tractive effort.

Use
The 2361s were originally allocated to the Worcester Division, and then worked in the London area. Some subsequently worked in the Wolverhampton Division, and at miscellaneous sheds such as Neath, Llanelly, Bristol and Oswestry.

Withdrawal
Most were withdrawn in the 1930s, and all had gone by the end of 1946.

References

2361
0-6-0 locomotives
Railway locomotives introduced in 1885
Standard gauge steam locomotives of Great Britain
Scrapped locomotives
Freight locomotives